Manufacture Royale is a Swiss luxury watch brand. Founded in the eighteenth century, the brand was revived in 2010.

History
In 1770, philosopher Voltaire supports the establishment of watchmaking workshops in Ferney-Voltaire near Geneva and Manufacture Royale is established. It is then an important producer of timepieces and the famous Jean-Antoine Lépine, clockmaker to the king, is one of its watchmakers. 
Manufacture Royale also made objets d'art such as table watches. 
The Manufacture gently disappeared in the vicissitude of time but was revived in 2010.
Manufacture Royale was bought by the Gouten family in 2013 and Alexis Gouten took over the management

Watches
Modern watches of the brand are complicated Haute Horlogerie, manufactured in-house. The first models were tourbillon watches and a minute repeater. It was followed by the Androgyne, 1770 and voltige collections. The brand has been manage by Alexis Gouten.

See also
List of watch manufacturers

References

External links
Roberta Naas, Forbes, Manufacture Royale Voltige
The Watches TV, Introduction to Manufacture Royale

Watch manufacturing companies of Switzerland
Swiss watch brands
Privately held companies of Switzerland